Stick to Your Guns is a 1941 American Western film directed by Lesley Selander, written by J. Benton Cheney, and starring William Boyd, Andy Clyde, Brad King, Jennifer Holt, Dick Curtis, Weldon Heyburn, and Henry Hall. It was released on September 17, 1941, by Paramount Pictures.

Plot

Cast 
 William Boyd as Hopalong Cassidy
 Andy Clyde as California Carlson
 Brad King as Johnny Nelson
 Jennifer Holt as June Winters
 Dick Curtis as Nevada Teale
 Weldon Heyburn as Henchman Gila
 Henry Hall as Jud Winters
 Jack Rockwell as Henchman Carp
 Ian MacDonald as Henchman Elbows
 Kermit Maynard as Henchman Layton
 Charles Middleton as Long Ben 
 Homer Holcomb as Lanky Smith
 Tom London as Waffles 
 Tom Ung as Chinese Charlie
 Jimmy Wakely as Pete 
 Johnny Bond as Skinny 
 Dick Reinhart as Bow-Wow

References

External links 
 
 
 
 

1941 films
American black-and-white films
1940s English-language films
Paramount Pictures films
American Western (genre) films
1941 Western (genre) films
Films directed by Lesley Selander
Hopalong Cassidy films
1940s American films